The Ambassador from Israel to Mexico is Israel's foremost diplomatic representative in Mexico.

List of ambassadors
Jonathan Peled 2015 - 
Rodica Radian-Gordon 2010 - 2015
Yosef Livne 2006 - 2010
David Dadonn 2003 - 2006
Yosef Amihud 2001 - 2003
Moshe Melamed 1995 - 2001
David Tourgeman 1991 - 1995
Dov Shmorak 1987 - 1991
Moshe Arad 1983 - 1987
Israel Gur Arieh 1981 - 1983
Shaul Rosolio 1977 - 1981
Hanan Einor 1974 - 1977
Shlomo Argov 1971 - 1974
Avraham Darom 1968 - 1971
Shimshon Arad 1964 - 1968 
Simcha Pratt 1963 - 1964
Mordekhai Shneeron 1960 - 1963
Ambassador David Shaltiel 1956 - 1959
Minister Yossef Keisari 1953 - 1956

References

Mexico
Israel